Maharashtra Major State Highway 10, commonly referred to as MH or MSH-10, is a major state highway that runs north east through Amravati districts in the state of Maharashtra. This state highway touches numerous cities and villages Viz. Nandgoan, Morshi,  Warud and then proceeds north-west towards Maharashtra-Madhya Pradesh state border. This highway enters in Madhya Pradesh State near Bangoan village which is on border of Amravati district of Maharashtra and Chhindwara district of Madhya Pradesh and ends at Bangoan village which is just 15 km East of Pandhurna in Madhya Pradesh.

Summary 
This  highway is passing along with Upper Wardha Dam popularly known as Nal Damyanti Sagar Dam.

Route description 
Below is the brief summary of the route followed by this state highway.

Amravati District 
This highway starts off from intersection of National Highway 47 near Nandgoan village and proceeds North-West towards Pusla village in Warud Taluka.

Chandur Taluka

Morshi Taluka

Warud Taluka

Major junctions

National highways 
National Highway NH-53 near Nandgoan village, Amravati district.

State highways 
 State Highway-244 at Warud city, Warud taluka, Amravati District.
 State Highway-247 at Warud city, Warud taluka, Amravati District.
 State Highway-240 at Morshi city, Morshi taluka, Amravati District.
 State Highway 24A at Nandgoan village, Amravati taluka, Amravati District.

Connections 
Many villages, cities and towns in various districts are connected by this state highway.
Nandgoan
Morshi
Warud

References

See also 
 List of State Highways in Maharashtra

State Highways in Maharashtra